Lupinus adsurgens is a species of lupine known by the common name Drew's silky lupine. It is native to the Sierra Nevada and coastal mountain ranges of northern California and southern Oregon, where it grows in forest and other mountain habitat. It is a perennial herb growing  in height. The herbage is hairy and silvery or gray-green in color. The flower is pale pink or purple to yellowish with a white or yellow patch on the banner.

References

External links

Jepson Manual Treatment
Photo gallery

adsurgens
Flora of California
Flora of Oregon